Ærø Plus is a local political party set in Ærø Municipality.

History
Ærø Plus was founded in September, 2013, with Carl Jørgen Heide as the chairman.

At the 2013 local election, the list ran with 11 candidates in Ærø Municipality. They got 14.4% of the votes in that municipality, which resulted in two municipal seats. Søren Vestergaard and Carl Jørgen Heide were elected for the list.

Election results

Municipal elections

References

Local political parties in Denmark
Political parties established in 2013
2013 establishments in Denmark